Hennigsdorf is a railway station in the Oberhavel district of Brandenburg, located in the town of Hennigsdorf. It is the northern terminus of the S-Bahn line  as well as a station for regional passenger trains and freight services.

History

The station was opened together with the Berlin–Velten section of the Kremmener Bahn on 1 October 1893. The line was served by frequent commuter trains in particular after 1900, and in 1927 the line between Berlin and Velten was electrified with direct current supplied by a third-rail and became part of the Berlin S-Bahn system. From 1931 until 1945 Hennigsdorf station was also the northern terminus of the branch line from Spandau West which was operated by the Berlin tramways and figured as tramway route 120.

As a consequence of World War II and the German partition, the station was close to the border with West Berlin. The S-Bahn traffic over the border was initially unhindered, but since 1954 a checkpoint station was established between Hennigsdorf station and the border in Hennigsdorf Süd. It was later called Stolpe Süd, and from 1958 it also served the public traffic. To avoid passing West Berlin, the Berlin outer ring was built, which crossed the Kremmener Bahn north of Hennigsdorf since 1953. At the intersection of the two routes an interchange station Hennigsdorf Nord was constructed, facilitating quick and easy transfer of passengers between trains due to its conception on two levels (Turmbahnhof). In addition, two connecting curves were built between Hennigsdorf and the outer ring. As early as 1951, the station was equipped with an all-relay signal box with display interlocking. Together with the stations in Wildau and Königs Wusterhausen it was one of the first three Reichsbahn stations receiving such equipment.

When the border to West Berlin was closed off on 13 August 1961, the rail traffic to Berlin was interrupted, and Hennigsdorf station became a terminus on the territory of the GDR. DC S-Bahn trains between Hennigsdorf and Velten continued to run until 1983, then they were replaced by diesel trains. In 1984, the station, the line to Velten, and the connecting curves to the outer ring were electrified with AC supplied by overhead lines.

The S-Bahn station was reopened on 15 December 1998 when the section between Tegel and Hennigsdorf was taken into service again, initially only with a single track.

The states of Berlin and Brandenburg investigate the feasibility of extending the Regional-Express route from Wittenberge and Wittstock along the Kremmener Bahn to Berlin-Gesundbrunnen station. This would give Hennigsdorf station regional train services towards the south. Between Hennigsdorf and Tegel, the tracks could be shared by S-Bahn and regional trains.

Train services

The S-Bahn traffic to Berlin was interrupted in 1961 when construction of the Berlin Wall began. Until 1983, S-Bahn trains still operated between Hennigsdorf and Velten, running about twice an hour, albeit without a fixed timetable. In addition, there were some trains to places on the western outer ring and to Oranienburg, especially in rush hour traffic. After 1983, the traffic to Velten was switched to locomotive-hauled trains. The section of Kremmener Bahn between Hennigsdorf and Velten was electrified in 1984 with alternating current. Most of the trains on the outer ring of Berlin did not use Hennigsdorf station, but Hennigsdorf Nord station, which was located outside the city, and trains to and from Velten served as a feeder from and to Hennigsdorf station. Since 1995, Hennigsdorf Nord is no longer served, since most commuter trains leave from the outer ring directly to Hennigsdorf station.

For some time in the years 1994/95, Hennigsdorf station was a terminus of the so-called Duo S-Bahn (line S 19) on the 17-kilometer line to Oranienburg. Between Oranienburg and Birkenwerder these trains ran on DC using the S-Bahn tracks, between Birkenwerder and Hennigsdorf they ran on Diesel power on the Berlin outer ring tracks via Hohen Neuendorf West.

Since 1998, the station is again connected to the Berlin S-Bahn, trains running every 20 minutes and the journey taking 26 minutes to Gesundbrunnen 26 and 34 minutes to Friedrichstraße.

The station is served by the following service(s):

Regional express services  Wittenberge – Pritzwalk – Wittstock – Neuruppin – Hennigsdorf – Berlin
Regionalbahn (local services)  Potsdam – Golm – Hennigsdorf – Oranienburg
Regionalbahn  Kremmen – Hennigsdorf
Berlin S-Bahn route  Hennigsdorf – Tegel – Gesundbrunnen – Friedrichstraße – Potsdamer Platz – Sudkreuz – Lichterfelde – Teltow

References

Hennigsdorf
Railway stations in Brandenburg
Buildings and structures in Oberhavel
Railway stations in Germany opened in 1893